Thomas F. Byrnes (May 2, 1859 – December 16, 1916) was an American politician from New York.

Life 
Thomas was born on May 2, 1859, in Brooklyn, New York. He was the son of Irish immigrants Michael Byrnes and Margaret Quigley.

After graduating public school, he became a horseshoer. Over time, he became shops foreman of the Brooklyn City Railroad Company, president of the Journeymen Horseshoers' National Union of the United States of America, a delegate to the Brooklyn Central Labor Union, and a delegate to the District Assembly No. 75, Knights of Labor.

A Democrat, he was elected in 1889 to the New York State Assembly, representing the Kings County 10th District. He served in the Assembly in 1890, 1891, 1892, and 1893

After he left the Assembly, Thomas worked as a contractor for several years, but remained active in local politics. He was appointed Deputy Commissioner of Water Supply, Gas, and Electricity in January 1904, and shortly after being removed from the position in May he was appointed Collector of City Revenue and Superintendent of Markets. In 1906, he was appointed real estate appraiser for the Finance Department. In 1911, New York governor John Alden Dix appointed him Tax Commissioner of New York. In December 1915, Thomas was made under sheriff, a position he held for the remainder of his life. Thomas also served as a delegate to the 1912 and 1916 Democratic National Conventions.

Thomas was married to Rose Gillen, and they had two daughters, Beatrice and Agnes. Thomas was a member of several organizations, including the Benevolent and Protective Order of Elks and the Montauk Club.

Thomas died in his Brooklyn home on December 16, 1916. He was buried in Holy Cross Cemetery.

References

External links 

 Political Graveyard
 Find a Grave

1859 births
1916 deaths
Democratic Party members of the New York State Assembly
Tax Commissioners of New York (state)
Knights of Labor people
Politicians from Brooklyn
19th-century American politicians
20th-century American politicians
American trade unionists of Irish descent
Burials at Holy Cross Cemetery, Brooklyn